These Simple Truths is the Sidewalk Prophets first major-label studio album with Word Records, released on August 25, 2009. It features the hit radio singles "The Words I Would Say" and "You Love Me Anyway."  The main genre the Sidewalk Prophets play in is Contemporary Christian music.  The first hit from this CD, "The Words I Would Say" which is also featured on WOW Hits 2010 and WOW Hits 2011.

Critical reception

Christian Music Review's Kevin Davis said "this is a very solid debut album and fans of Rascal Flatts, 33Miles and Julian Drive will greatly enjoy Sidewalk Prophets." Also, Davis wrote "This is one of the best debut albums I’ve heard this year along with MIKESCHAIR and Revive."

Cross Rhythms' Paul Kerslake said "this is full of catchy, poignant and impacting songs." In addition, Kerslake wrote "This is an essential release; I can't wait to hear what they follow it up with."

Jesus Freak Hideout's Scott Fryberger said "It's safe to say that Sidewalks Prophets have an album on their hands that will be fairly popular on AC radio. Just about every song has 'hit song' potential." Furthermore, Fryberger wrote that the album "is happy, encouraging and, overall, not too shabby. At times, the lyrics lack in songwriting quality, but definitely not in substance. A good recommendation for fans of any of the aforementioned bands, or Christian hit radio in general."

Louder Than The Music Suzanne Physick said "while some may shun this album for its lack of creativity, those who just appreciate good music and honest beautifully written sentiments will love this new offering from a truly great band." Additionally, Physick called the 'Standout Tracks' on the album the following: "Show Me How to Love", "You Love Me Anyway" and "You Will Never Leave Me".

Praise Charts CMSpin said "Whether you like your music up tempo in the pop/rock vein, or piano driven and melodic, you'll be very satisfied after listening to the music that's found on These Simple Truths." Plus, CMSpin called the 'Favorite Songs' on the album the following: "Just Might Change Your Life", "The Words I Would Say", "Give It All Away", "Lay Down My Life".

Accolades
In 2010, the album was nominated for a Dove Award for Pop/Contemporary Album of the Year at the 41st GMA Dove Awards.

Track listing

Charts

Album
This is the charts for the deluxe album version because the standard version failed to chart.

Singles

See also
 Word Records

References

Sources
Jesus Freak Hideout
 Jesus Freak Hideout
[ Sidewalk Prophets album, These Simple Truths: Album & Song Chart History]

2009 albums
Word Records albums